Vriesea pauperrima is a plant species in the genus Vriesea. This species is endemic to Brazil.

References

pauperrima
Flora of Brazil